(infinitive sessions) is the fourth studio album by the Italian experimental rock band Starfuckers, released in 2002.

Track list
 "Blues Off"
 "Drive On"
 "Off Blues"
 "Eternal Soundcheck"
 "Funked X"
 "Vamped X"

Line-up
Manuele Giannini: guitars
Roberto Bertacchini: drums
Alessandro Bocci: electronics

References

2002 albums
Starfuckers albums